The Freemason's Hall on Fiennes Street Toodyay, Western Australia was built in 1879.

It was built on land donated by Charles Marris for the purpose of building a temple for the Temperance movement (International Organisation of Good Templars). The Templars used the place and it was also the venue for Methodist Church services until 1898. In 1899, the Rev E Holliday purchased the building for the Freemasons. In 1924, an additional wing was constructed designed by architect and fellow Freemason, Percy Harrison. When the road was widened, the front steps were demolished and the front door bricked up (original dressings around the opening are still visible).

References 

Buildings and structures in Toodyay, Western Australia
Fiennes Street, Toodyay
Heritage places in Toodyay, Western Australia
International Organisation of Good Templars